was a Japanese daimyō of the Edo period, who ruled the Takasu Domain and then the Owari Domain. As lord of Takasu he used the name . His childhood name was Daigoro (代五郎).

Family
 Father: Matsudaira Tomoaki (1678-1728), son of Tokugawa Mitsutomo of Owari Domain
 Mother: Oshige no Kata
 Wife: Tokugawa Mitsuhime, daughter of Tokugawa Yoshimichi of Owari Domain
 Concubines:
 Okayo no Kata
 Otase no Kata
 Oyatsu no Kata
 Osume no Kata
 Otome no Kata
 Tokuei'in
 Senyuin
 Terashima-Dono
 Children:
 Yorozunosuke (1730-1732) by Mitsuhime
 Fusahime betrothed to Shimazu Munenobu of Satsuma Domain by Okayo
 Tokugawa Munechika by Okayo
 Matsudaira Yoshitoshi (1734-1771) by Otase
 Toyohime married Uesugi Shigesada of Yonezawa Domain by Otase
 Matsudaira Katsushige by Otase
 Matsudaira Katsunaga (1737-1811) by Otase
 Naito Yorita (1741-1771) by Otase
 Matsudaira Katsutsuna by Oyatsu
 Takenokoshi Katsuoki (1738-1789) by Oyatsu
 Kunihime married Asano Shigeakira of Hiroshima Domain by Oyatsu
 Inoue Masakuni (1739-1791) by Osume
 Hi-hime married Matsudaira Yorisaki of Hitachi-Fuchu Domain by Osume
 Kyohime married Kujo Michisaki by Tokuei'in
 Yokohime married Asano Shigeakira of Hiroshima Domain by Tokuei'in
 Matsudaira Katsutaka by Terashima
 Naito Masanobu (1752-1805) by Senyuin

Reference

|-

1705 births
1761 deaths
Lords of Owari
Owari Tokugawa family
Owarirenshi-Matsudaira clan